Minjavan-e Sharqi Rural District is in Minjavan District of Khoda Afarin County, East Azerbaijan province, Iran. At the National Census of 2006, its population was 5,727 in 1,376 households, when it was in the former Khoda Afarin District of Kaleybar County. There were 5,213 inhabitants in 1,460 households at the following census of 2011, by which time Khoda Afarin District had been raised to the level of a county and divided into three districts. At the most recent census of 2016, the population of the rural district was 5,066 in 1,715 households. The largest of its 37 villages was Janan Lu, with 1,742 people.

References 

Khoda Afarin County

Rural Districts of East Azerbaijan Province

Populated places in East Azerbaijan Province

Populated places in Khoda Afarin County